Hiroshi Sekita (関田 寛士, born October 2, 1989) is a Japanese football former player.

Club statistics
Updated to 23 February 2017.

References

External links
Profile at Nagano Parceiro

1989 births
Living people
Toin University of Yokohama alumni
Association football people from Kanagawa Prefecture
Japanese footballers
J2 League players
J3 League players
FC Gifu players
AC Nagano Parceiro players
Association football defenders